SS Royal William was a Canadian side-wheel paddle steamship that is sometimes credited with the first crossing of the Atlantic Ocean almost entirely under steam power, in 1833, using sails only during periods of boiler maintenance. Earlier vessels that crossed partially under steam include the British-built Dutch-owned Curaçao in 1827 and the sail-steam hybrid  in 1819.

She was drawn by 21-year old James Goudie who had by then served his apprenticeship, likely at Scotts Shipbuilding and Engineering Company of Greenock, Scotland, a seaport on the Firth of Clyde and also the birthplace of James Watt.

History

Genesis

She was commissioned by brewer John Molson, George Black and John Saxton Campbell and a group of investors from various colonies in British North America, including whom subscribed 196 shares at £25 in Halifax, Nova Scotia.  There were all told 235 investors of a total £16,000 in the Quebec and Halifax Steam Navigation Company. The incorporation occurred on 31 March 1830.

Construction
The ship was built in Cape Blanc, Quebec by John Saxton Campbell and George Black, who laid its keel on 2 September 1830. She was launched on 27 April 1831 by Lady and Lord Aylmer at Cape Cove, Quebec. Her steam engines were manufactured and installed in Montreal, at the premises of the Bennet and Henderson Foundry, near the foot of St. Mary's current. Her shakedown voyage under steam from there to Quebec (calling at Sorel and Three Rivers en route) occurred on 13 August 1831, after which she was officially registered on 22 August.

Career as mail packeteer
She made several trips between Quebec and the Atlantic colonies in 1831, but travel became restricted because of the cholera epidemic in 1832. Some shareowners protested that she had been poorly maintained over the winter, and as a result costly repairs that should have been unnecessary were required. One legislator suggested that the annual subsidy not be paid because the Royal William had not fulfilled her schedule. The losses bankrupted the venture because the loans went unpaid. The owners lost some £16,000 on the venture. On 3 April 1833 she was purchased at auction by a half-dozen mortgage holders and original shareholders for £5,000.

Sale in England
Her owners decided to sail her to Europe and find a buyer. She departed from Pictou, Nova Scotia on 18 August 1833 with seven passengers, a small amount of freight and a large load of coal and arrived at Gravesend on the River Thames after a 25-day passage that included a stop at the Cowes, Isle of Wight for a fresh coat of paint.

Aside from a one-day pause to clean her boilers, the ship had crossed non stop using its steam engines. Royal William, which initially sold for £10,000, was eventually flipped to the Spanish Navy where, renamed to Isabel Segunda (after Queen Isabella II), she served for many years and earned the distinction of being the first steamship to fire in anger over Zarauz 14 April 1839 during First Carlist War.

On 8 January 1860 Isabel Segunda was driven ashore and wrecked at Algeciras.

Legacy
One of Royal Williams co-owners was Samuel Cunard a merchant from Halifax, Nova Scotia who drew important lessons from the ship which he applied when he founded the Cunard Steamship Company a few years later.

In the town of Pictou there is a Royal Canadian Sea Cadet Corps named after this vessel.  A large wooden model of Royal William is on display at the Maritime Museum of the Atlantic in Halifax.

References

Bibliography
 Eileen Reid Marcil, The PS Royal William of Quebec, Baraka Books, Montreal, 2020, 132 p.

Steamships
Ships built in Quebec
1831 ships
Merchant ships of Canada
1831 establishments in North America
Frigates of Spain
Maritime incidents in January 1860